Raisin bran (sultana bran in some countries; see sultana grape) is a breakfast cereal containing raisins and bran flakes. Raisin bran is manufactured by several companies under a variety of brand names, including the popularly known Kellogg's Two Scoops Raisin Bran, General Mills' Total Raisin Bran, and Post Cereals' Raisin Bran. This popular breakfast cereal is a staple in households all over the United States, in part because of its advertised nutritional value.

History

Skinner's Raisin-BRAN was the first raisin bran brand on the market, introduced in the United States in 1926 by the Skinner Manufacturing Company. For 17 years, Skinner had ownership over the product's name, until Kellogg's and Post began to sell their own versions of raisin bran. With concerns of losing money within grocery store sales, Skinner filed a cease-and-desist in an attempt to keep ownership over his raisin bran product.

The name "Raisin-BRAN" was at one time trademarked by Skinner, however in 1944 the U.S. Court of Appeals for the Eighth Circuit found:

The name "Raisin-BRAN" could not be appropriated as a trade-mark, because: "A name which is merely descriptive of the ingredients, qualities or characteristics of an article of trade cannot be appropriated as a trademark and the exclusive use of it afforded legal protection. The use of a similar name by another to truthfully describe his own product does not constitute a legal or moral wrong, even if its effect be to cause the public to mistake the origin or ownership of the product."  Now, any brand or manufacturer may create their own version of raisin bran and name it just that.

Ingredients
Kellogg's Raisin Bran in the United States contains the following ingredients: whole grain wheat, raisins, wheat bran, sugar, brown sugar syrup, malt flavor, salt, and assorted vitamins and minerals. The cereal's vitamin D3 supplementation is made from lanolin, which is an animal product, rendering it as a non-vegan breakfast cereal.

Healthful debate

Raisin bran cereal is commonly referred to as a "healthy" breakfast cereal because of its high fiber content, but according to Consumer Reports, Kellogg's Raisin Bran has a low nutrition rating.

In 1991, Kellogg's complained that the guidelines for the USDA's supplemental assistance WIC program did not allow for the purchase of Kellogg's Raisin Bran for containing too much sugar. Currently, with 17 grams of sugar per cup, it has a higher content of sugar than Lucky Charms, Reese's Puffs, and Cocoa Krispies (all known to be "sugary" cereals).

On the other hand, Kellogg's Sultana Bran received 4.5 stars out of 5 on the Australian Government's Health Star Rating System. In addition, a plain serving of Kellogg's Raisin Bran provides 80% of the Daily Value of manganese and 6% of the Daily Value of potassium, both important nutrients for the body.

Research suggests that eating commercially produced raisin bran containing sugared raisins produces acid which can lead to cavities, while home-made raisin bran, created by adding plain, unsugared raisins to bran flakes, produces less of this acid.

Manufacturers 

 Kellogg's
 Post Consumer Brands
 General Mills

See also

References

External links

 Raisin Bran (Post Consumer Brands)
 Raisin Bran (Kellogg's)

 A quantitative analysis of Kellogg's Raisin Bran (Science Creative Quarterly)

Products introduced in 1926
Kellogg's cereals
Flaked breakfast cereals